Atrotorquata is a genus of fungi in the family Cainiaceae. The genus is monotypic, containing the single species Atrotorquata lineata, found in the US and first described in 1993.

References

Xylariales
Monotypic Sordariomycetes genera